The 1949 San Jose State Spartans football team represented San Jose State College during the 1949 college football season.

San Jose State competed in the California Collegiate Athletic Association. The team was led by head coach Wilbur V. Hubbard, in his fourth year, and played home games at Spartan Stadium in San Jose, California. They finished the season as champion of the CCAA with a record of nine wins and four losses (9–4, 4–0 CCAA). As champion, the Spartans were invited to the 1949 Raisin Bowl, played in Fresno, California. They defeated the Border Intercollegiate Athletic Association (Border Conference) champion Texas Tech Red Raiders in the game.

Schedule

Team players in the NFL
The following San Jose State players were selected in the 1950 NFL Draft.

The following finished their San Jose State career in 1949, were not drafted, but played in the NFL.

Notes

References

San Jose State
San Jose State Spartans football seasons
California Collegiate Athletic Association football champion seasons
San Jose State Spartans football